Mavatiku Michelino Visi, commonly known as Michelino, is a soukous recording artist, composer, guitarist and vocalist, in the Democratic Republic of the Congo (DRC). He was a member of the Congolese band African Fiesta Nationale, which was later renamed Afrisa International, led by Congolese music superstar, Tabu Ley. Later, in the early 1970s, Michelino left Afrisa and joined TPOK Jazz, led by François Luambo Makiadi, which dominated the Congolese music scene from the 1950s through the 1980s.
 
Born and raised by Angolan parents, in the Congolese port-city of Matadi, Michelino moved to Kinshasa, as a teenager. Michelino now lives, plays and teaches music in Paris, France. He has a band of about eight members.

Discography
 Makfe - With Afrisa International
 Salima - With TP OK Jazz - Sung by Josky Kiambukuta, Ndombe Opetum and Wuta Mayi
 Cassins Clay - With Afrisa International
 Moussa - With Afrisa International

External links
 Overview of Composition of TPOK Jazz

See also

References

Democratic Republic of the Congo musicians
20th-century Democratic Republic of the Congo male singers
1946 births
Living people
People from Matadi
TPOK Jazz members
Democratic Republic of the Congo guitarists